Glubokoye Lake (literally: "Deep Lake") may refer to one of the following.

Lake Glubokoye (Antarctica)
Profound Lake, Antarctica
Lake Glubokoye (Putorana), near Norilsk, Russia
Lake Glubokoye (Karelian Isthmus), in Vyborgsky District of Leningrad Oblast, Russia